Joel Rosenman (born 1942) conceived and co-created the Woodstock Festival in 1969. Rosenman thought of the idea for the three-day concert when he and business partner John Roberts were evaluating a proposal from Michael Lang and Artie Kornfeld for a recording studio in upstate New York. The four went on to create the event. Rosenman and Roberts are the co-authors of Making Woodstock, originally published as Young Men with Unlimited Capital, a non-fiction account of their exploits as producers of Woodstock.

Childhood and education
Born the second of three children, Rosenman grew up on Long Island in the town of Cold Spring Harbor, New York. He is Jewish.

Early career and media sound
In 1967, after hearing Rosenman perform at The Bitter End in Greenwich Village, John Hammond, then head of A&R at Columbia Records, offered Rosenman a recording contract as a vocalist. Rosenman opted instead for a career in writing and venture capital with friend, and then partner, John P. Roberts.

In 1967, Rosenman and Roberts drafted the pilot episode of a situation comedy based on two young men looking for investment opportunities. In search of plot material for the series, they placed a classified ad in The New York Times and The Wall Street Journal claiming to be "Young men with unlimited capital" looking for "legitimate and interesting...business proposals."  Rosenman and Roberts received hundreds of harebrained responses, but along with them came a few responses which seemed legitimate and intriguing.  They decided to investigate those proposals as possible investments.  Along the way, the sitcom was shelved.  The two main characters of the first episode had come to life as entrepreneurs named Rosenman and Roberts.

Portrayals
In the 2009 film Taking Woodstock Rosenman is portrayed by Daniel Eric Gold. Rosenman also appears in several other Woodstock-related films, TV shows, interviews, panels.

References

1942 births
Living people
people from Cold Spring Harbor, New York
American music industry executives
20th-century American Jews
21st-century American Jews
Woodstock Festival